The 1958 Utah Redskins football team was an American football team that represented the University of Utah as a member of the Skyline Conference during the 1958 NCAA University Division football season. In their first season under head coach Ray Nagel, the Redskins compiled an overall record of 4–7 with a mark of 3–3 against conference opponents, placing fifth in the Skyline. Home games were played on campus at Ute Stadium in Salt Lake City. The Skyline Conference champions were led on the field by senior quarterback Lee Grosscup and junior safety and halfback Larry Wilson, a future member of the Pro Football Hall of Fame.

Schedule

Personnel
 QB Lee Grosscup, Sr.

NFL Draft
Utah had one player selected in the 1959 NFL Draft.

References

External links
 Official game program: Idaho at Utah – October 4, 1958

Utah
Utah Utes football seasons
Utah Redskins football